is a Japanese former game producer at Square Enix and currently Senior Advisor at Sony Music Entertainment Japan and a board member at Forwardworks. He served as the Final Fantasy series Brand Manager for over a decade, was an Executive Officer at Square Enix board of directors and he was the Head of Square Enix's Business Division 3 for 6 years. He is also the co-creator of the Kingdom Hearts series. He served as corporate executive of the company's 1st Production Department during its entire existence.

In May 2021, Hashimoto announced he would be working in Square Enix Holdings as Corporate Advisor training future leaders of the company, after he stepped down from his position of Executive Director and Final Fantasy Brand Manager at Square Enix Co.

Hashimoto retired from his duties at Square Enix on May 31, 2022. On June 16, 2022, Hashimoto announced he would be a Senior Advisor at Sony Music Entertainment Japan, as well as board member for ForwardWorks.

Biography

Early work
Hashimoto previously worked for the toy company Bandai. He joined Squaresoft (later known as Square Enix) in 1995, which is where he spent the rest of his career.

Final Fantasy
He was the promotions producer for Final Fantasy VII.
When asked at E3 2008 about the possibility of a remake of Final Fantasy VII, he said that Square Enix is aware fans would like that, and that they are very busy making other titles first. As Final Fantasy X-2 and Kingdom Hearts were being completed, the learning experience the team had during the Compilation of Final Fantasy VII project spawned the Fabula Nova Crystallis series which was supposed to build on it.

Kingdom Hearts
When Square was sharing a building in Tokyo with the Disney corporation, Hashimoto found himself conversing in an elevator with a Disney executive, and there they conceived the crossover between Square Enix and Disney called Kingdom Hearts. Hashimoto has stated that the new features in Kingdom Hearts II were the result of the success of the first game and Disney's increased trust in Square Enix to pull off an excellent product.

Other games
While working on Front Mission Evolved, one of the challenges was balancing the speed of the real time battles the wanzers, or mechs, were having so that the game was realistic to the mechs size, but also still fast enough to be engaging.

Priorities
While discussing Final Fantasy XIII, Hashimoto mentioned that Square Enix has been attempting to make localization of their game releases close the release gap between Japan and the rest of the world.

Games

As producer
Famicom Jump: Hero Retsuden (1989)
Famicom Jump II: Saikyō no Shichinin (1991)
Dragon Ball Z (1993)
Dragon Ball Z 2: Super Battle (1994)
Front Mission (1995)
Treasure Hunter G (1996)
Tobal 2 (1997)
Front Mission Alternative (1997)
Chocobo's Dungeon (1997)
Final Fantasy VIII (1999)
Chocobo Racing (1999)
Cyber Org (1999)
Driving Emotion Type-S (2000)
Final Fantasy IX (2000)
The Bouncer (2000)
Wild Card (2001)
Kingdom Hearts (2002)
Kingdom Hearts: Chain of Memories (2004)
Kingdom Hearts II (2005)
Kingdom Hearts Re:Chain of Memories (2007)
The World Ends with You (2007)
Front Mission Evolved (2010)
Imaginary Range (2011)
Imaginary Range II (2012)
Final Fantasy (Nintendo 3DS version, 2015)
Final Fantasy VII (iOS version, 2015)
Final Fantasy IX (iOS, Android & Windows PC versions, 2016)
Pukux (2016)
Final Fantasy VII (Android version, 2016)
World of Final Fantasy (2016)
Final Fantasy XV (2016)
Final Fantasy IX (PlayStation 4 version, 2017)
The Last Remnant (PlayStation 4 version, 2018)
Final Fantasy IX (Xbox One & Nintendo Switch versions, 2019)
Left Alive (2019)
Final Fantasy VII (Xbox One & Nintendo Switch versions, 2019)
The Last Remnant (Nintendo Switch version, 2019)
Final Fantasy VIII (PlayStation 4, Xbox One, Nintendo Switch, & Windows versions, 2019)

As executive producer
JoJo's Bizarre Adventure (1993)
Bastard!!: Ankoku no Hakai-shin (1994)
Front Mission: Gun Hazard (1996)
Tobal No. 1 (1996)
Final Fantasy IV (PlayStation version, 1997)
Einhänder (1997)
Final Fantasy V (PlayStation version, 1998)
Ehrgeiz (2000)
Final Fantasy IV Advance (2005)
Final Fantasy V Advance (2006)
Final Fantasy VI Advance (2006)
Final Fantasy (PlayStation Portable version, 2007)
Final Fantasy II (PlayStation Portable version, 2007)
The World Ends with You (2007)
Final Fantasy Fables: Chocobo's Dungeon (2007)
Kingdom Hearts coded (2008)
Chrono Trigger (Nintendo DS version, 2008)
Yosumin DS (2009)
Kingdom Hearts 358/2 Days (2009)
Final Fantasy XIII (2009)
Kingdom Hearts Birth by Sleep (2010)
Estpolis: The Lands Cursed by the Gods (2010)
Kingdom Hearts Re:coded (2010)
The 3rd Birthday (2010)
Final Fantasy Type-0 (2011)
Final Fantasy XIII-2 (2011)
Final Fantasy IV: The Complete Collection (2012)
Kingdom Hearts Dream Drop Distance (2012)
Final Fantasy III (PlayStation Portable version, 2012)
Final Fantasy All the Bravest (2013)
Kingdom Hearts HD 1.5 Remix (2013)
Lightning Returns: Final Fantasy XIII (2013)
Final Fantasy X/X-2 HD Remaster (2013)
Kingdom Hearts HD 2.5 Remix (2014)
Final Fantasy Explorers (2014)
Final Fantasy X/X-2 HD Remaster (PlayStation 4 version, 2015)
Kingdom Hearts χ (2015)
Dissidia Final Fantasy (2015)
Final Fantasy VII (PlayStation 4 version, 2015)
Final Fantasy X/X-2 HD Remaster (Windows PC version, 2016)
Kingdom Hearts HD 2.8 Final Chapter Prologue (2017)
Final Fantasy XII: The Zodiac Age (2017)
World of Final Fantasy: Meli-Melo (2017)
Dissidia Final Fantasy NT (2018)
Kingdom Hearts III (2019)
Final Fantasy VII Remake (2020)
Neo: The World Ends with You (2021)

In other positions
Kidō Senshi Z-Gundam: Hot Scramble (1986): marketing
Chrono Trigger (1995): special thanks
Super Mario RPG (1996): special thanks
Final Fantasy VII (1997): publicity producer
Front Mission 2 (1997): project supervisor
Parasite Eve II (1999): special advisor
Star Ocean: Till the End of Time (2004): general manager
Final Fantasy X-2 (2003): sales and marketing producer
Front Mission 4 (2003): executive manager
Fullmetal Alchemist and the Broken Angel (2003): sales and marketing executive manager
Fullmetal Alchemist 2: Curse of the Crimson Elixir (2004): executive manager
Dragon Quest Heroes: Rocket Slime (2005): corporate executive
Project Sylpheed (2006): corporate executive
Dirge of Cerberus: Final Fantasy VII (2006): senior vice president
Dawn of Mana (2006): special thanks
Space Invaders Extreme (2008): general producer
Space Invaders Get Even (2008): general producer
The Last Remnant (2008): corporate executive
Puzzle Bobble Live (2009): general producer and general manager
Qix++ (2009): general producer
Final Fantasy VII, Windows PC version (2012): senior executive managing officer
Final Fantasy XIV: A Realm Reborn (2013): special thanks
Final Fantasy XIV: Heavensward (2015): special thanks
Final Fantasy: Brave Exvius (2015): production executive
Star Ocean: Integrity and Faithlessness (2016): division executive
Itadaki Street: Dragon Quest and Final Fantasy 30th Anniversary (2017) — special thanks

Filmography
Final Fantasy VII: Advent Children (2005): producer
Last Order: Final Fantasy VII (2005): executive producer
Final Fantasy VII: Advent Children Complete (2009): producer
Kingsglaive: Final Fantasy XV (2016) producer

References

Japanese video game producers
1958 births
Living people
Komazawa University alumni
Square Enix people